Kitovo is a rural locality (a village) in Styopantsevskoye Rural Settlement, Vyaznikovsky District, Vladimir Oblast, Russia. The population was 14 as of 2010.

Geography 
Kitovo is located 43 km southwest of Vyazniki (the district's administrative centre) by road. Edon is the nearest rural locality.

References 

Rural localities in Vyaznikovsky District